The  is a river in Japan which has its source in the city of Sekigahara, Gifu Prefecture. It drains into the Kuise River, and ultimately flows into the Kiso River.

History
The river originates near Mount Ibuki in the northern part of Sekigahara and flows through central Tarui. The post town of Tarui-juku, a stop along the old Nakasendō trading route, used to sit along the banks of the river.

River communities
The river passes through or forms the boundary of Sekigahara, Tarui, Ōgaki, and Yōrō in Gifu Prefecture.

References

Rivers of Gifu Prefecture
Rivers of Japan